Jeramie Kling (born 1982) is an American drummer, recording engineer, producer, and live sound engineer best known for his work with extreme metal bands The Absence and Venom, Inc.  He is also a member of Ribspreader (drums), Goregäng (guitar/lead vocals), and Metal Blade act Necromancing the Stone.  Kling was a member of death metal band Massacre (drums/backing vocals)  from 2019 to 2020.  In 2021, he formed the band Inhuman Condition with Massacre and Obituary bassist Terry Butler (ex-Death) and Taylor Nordberg.

Kling was a founding member of The Absence and played drums on four of their albums, From Your Grave  (2005), Riders of the Plague (2007), Enemy Unbound (2010) and A Gift for the Obsessed (2018).  Enemy Unbound reached No. 55 on the Billboard Heatseekers chart following its release.  The Absence is currently signed to M-Theory Audio.

Kling became a member of Venom Inc. (Nuclear Blast) in 2018, following the departure of former drummer Abaddon. He uses the alias War Machine in that band.

Audio engineering
Kling has worked as a front of house audio engineer for internationally recognized metal bands including Deicide, Kataklysm, Sepultura, Venom Inc. (prior to becoming a member), Exodus, Soilwork, and Arsis among others.

Equipment and endorsements
Paiste cymbals
Aston microphones
Gator cases
KLOTZ cables 
DDrum

References 

1982 births
Living people